The 2022 Southeastern Louisiana Lions football team represented Southeastern Louisiana University as a member of the Southland Conference during the 2022 NCAA Division I FCS football season. They were led by head coach Frank Scelfo, who was coaching his fifth season with the program. The Lions played their home games at Strawberry Stadium in Hammond, Louisiana.

Preseason

Preseason poll
The Southland Conference released their preseason poll on July 20, 2022. The Lions were picked to finish first in the conference.

Preseason All–Southland Teams
The Southland Conference announced the 2022 preseason all-conference football team selections on July 13, 2022. Southeastern Louisiana had a total of 10 players selected. 

Offense

1st Team
Gage Larvadain – Wide receiver, SO
John Allen – Offensive lineman, JR
Jalen Bell – Offensive lineman, SR

2nd Team
Taron Jones – Running back, SR
CJ Turner – Wide receiver, RS-SR
Brennan Lanclos – Offensive lineman, RS-JR

Defense

1st Team
Garrett Crawford – Defensive lineman, JR
Zy Alexander – Defensive back, SO
Donniel Ward-McGee – Defensive back, SR
Gage Larvadain – Kick returner, SO

2nd Team
Bryce Cage – Defensive lineman, SO
Gage Larvadain – Punt returner, SO

Personnel

Schedule
Southeastern Louisiana Lions finalized their 2022 schedule on February 11, 2022.

Game summaries

at Louisiana

at Florida Atlantic

vs. Central Connecticut

vs. No. 4T Incarnate Word

vs. Murray State

vs. Texas A&M-Commerce

at Jacksonville State

at McNeese State

at Lamar

Statistics

vs. Northwestern State

at Nicholls

FCS Playoffs

vs. No. 18 Idaho - First Round

at No. 8 Samford - Second Round

References

Southeastern Louisiana Lions
Southeastern Louisiana Lions football seasons
Southland Conference football champion seasons
Southeastern Louisiana
Southeastern Louisiana Lions